= Euromanga =

Manga made in Europe by European artists

Euromanga refers to comics created by European artists that are significantly influenced by the visual and narrative styles of Japanese manga. It is not simply a copy of manga, but rather a hybrid form that blends Japanese aesthetics with local European traditions and sensibilities.

Euromanga is a significant example of how Japanese popular culture is received, interpreted, and transformed within European contexts and it can be considered a unique production that combines global and local elements, illustrating the ability of cultures to blend and enrich each other in a dynamic and ongoing process.
